Ceromitia auricrinis is a moth of the family Adelidae or fairy longhorn moths. It is found in Uganda.

References

Moths described in 1933
Adelidae
Endemic fauna of Uganda
Lepidoptera of Uganda